Wigura is a Polish surname. Notable people with the surname include:

 Karolina Wigura (born 1980), Polish sociologist and journalist
 Stanisław Wigura (1901–1932), Polish aircraft designer and aviator

See also
 

Polish-language surnames